Linda Mason is a cosmetician and artist.

Early life
Linda Mason was born in Sunderland, in the northeast of England, on 13 September 1946.  Mason's mother, an artist, initially inspired her fascination for artistic expression.  She got her start in the beauty industry modelling for haute couture designers in Paris while studying cosmetology.

Career
Mason moved to Beirut to teach cosmetology and sell cosmetics for Lancôme. In the late 1970s, she returned to Paris and became the premier makeup artist for Helena Rubenstein.  While making rounds at fashion shows, she observed that the makeup done by the models themselves was totally out of sync with the fashions they were wearing.  Mason then reinvented the role of makeup on the runway by personally applying the models’ makeup.  She worked on early collections for Jean-Paul Gaultier, John Galliano, Comme des Garçons, Yohji Yamamoto, Giorgio Armani, and Issey Miyake.

In the early 1980s, Mason moved to New York, where her work continued to make headlines. In response to a look she created for the photographer Steven Meisel, The Wall Street Journal stated that "Mason…took face painting out of punk and into high fashion."  She also worked with many celebrities, including Cameron Diaz, Uma Thurman, Brooke Shields, and Charlize Theron.

Mason launched her own makeup company, Linda Mason Elements, Inc., in 1987. In 1988, she developed cosmetic kits which were carried at Henri Bendel, Barney's, Saks Fifth Avenue, and Nordstrom.  She also continued to explore other styles of visual art, including multi-media collage and glass art. In 1998, she opened "The Art of Beauty by Linda Mason," a shop and gallery in Soho, New York City. "An Aladdin’s cave of makeup."

Exhibitions
Mason presented many exhibitions of her work at her Soho workshop and gallery, including Gone (2008), Spring Masquerade (2010), and Ageless Beauty (2011). She has had two solo exhibitions at the National Glass Centre in Sunderland: Visitors to the Seafront (2010) and A Day at the Beach (2015). Her most recent solo exhibition at Studio Vendome in Soho, NYCSensory Abstraction: Model as Mediumincluded a comprehensive selection of mixed-media panels, film, and paintings.

Publications
Mason has published several books:  Linda Mason's Sun Sign Makeovers (1985) and later Tanaka-Mason-Kostabi (1992), a collaborative book.  More recently, Makeup, The Art of Beauty, a handbook of techniques and approaches refined over her career, was published in September 2003 and re-released in paperback May 2007; in October 2004, Teen Makeup, Looks to Match Your Every Mood; and in April 2008 Eye Candy: 55 easy makeup looks for glam lids and luscious lashes .

Filmography
Mason has also directed many short films. The most notable of these is First Base, which was included in the NYC Independent Film Festival and the ASVOFF film festival at the Centre Pompidou in 2014.

References

British make-up artists
Living people
1946 births
American artists